The women's 100 metre butterfly S13 event at the 2016 Paralympic Games took place on 8 September 2016, at the Olympic Aquatics Stadium. Three heats were held. The swimmers with the eight fastest times advanced to the final.

Heats

Heat 1 
11:20 8 September 2016:

Heat 2 
11:24 8 September 2016:

Heat 3 
11:27 8 September 2016:

Final 
19:39 8 September 2016:

Notes

Swimming at the 2016 Summer Paralympics